The 442nd Air Expeditionary Squadron is a provisional United States Air Force unit.

The squadron was first activated during World War II as the 442nd Bombardment Squadron.  It served in combat in the Mediterranean Theater of Operations, where it earned two Distinguished Unit Citations and the French Croix de Guerre with Palm.  After V-E Day, the squadron returned to the United States for inactivation.

Although briefly active in the reserve from 1947 to 1949, the squadron was primarily a Strategic Air Command bomber unit with Boeing B-47 Stratojets.  The squadron was inactivated in 1960, in connection with the phasing out of the B-47.

Since 2011, the squadron has been active in the Middle East and Afghanistan.

History

World War II
Established in mid-1942 as a Martin B-26 Marauder medium bomber group.  Trained under Third Air Force in Florida, deployed to England under the VIII Air Support Command, 3d Bombardment Wing.

Operated against targets on the continent during early fall of 1942; deployed to North Africa as part of Twelfth Air Force after Operation Torch landings in Algeria in November.   Flew tactical bombing missions against Axis forces in North Africa until the end of the Tunisian campaign in May 1943.  Participated in the Sicilian and Italian Campaigns; liberation of Corsica and Sardinia and the Invasion of Southern France.   Supported Allied ground forces in the Western Allied Invasion of Germany, spring 1945 and becoming part of the United States Air Forces in Europe Army of Occupation in Germany, fall 1945.    Personnel demobilized in Germany and the squadron inactivated as a paper unit in December 1945.

Reserves
Reactivated in the reserves in 1947.  Never manned or equipped.

Strategic Air Command operations
Reactivated in 1952 as a Boeing B-47 Stratojet squadron,.  Initially equipped with prototypes of the Boeing RB-47B Stratojet (YRB-47) to perform long-range photo-reconnaissance with a flight of Boeing B-29 Superfortress bombers assigned.  In November 1953 began to receive production B-47E medium bomber aircraft; prototype reconnaissance aircraft already received exchanged for medium bomber versions.  Participated in SAC REFLEX deployments to Europe and North Africa throughout the 1950s.  Inactivated in 1960 as part of the phaseout of the B-47, aircraft sent to storage at Davis-Monthan.

Expeditionary operations 
The squadron redesignated as the 442nd Air Expeditionary Squadron and converted to provisional status on 13 May 2011. It activated at Ebril Air Base in Iraq on 17 January 2017 to provide combat support to Operation Inherent Resolve, supporting the movement of cargo and personnel across the Combined Joint Task Force area of operations. It inactivated on the 10 June 2021, with its role passed to the 443rd Air Expeditionary Squadron which activated at Al Asad Air Base.

Lineage
 Constituted as the 442nd Bombardment Squadron (Medium) on 19 June 1942
 Activated on 1 July 1942
 Redesignated 442nd Bombardment Squadron, Medium on 9 October 1944
 Inactivated on 6 December 1945
 Redesignated 442nd Bombardment Squadron, Light on 26 May 1947
 Activated in the reserve on 9 July 1947
 Inactivated on 27 June 1949
 Redesignated 442nd Bombardment Squadron, Medium and activated on 1 December 1952
 Discontinued on 15 September 1960
 Redesignated 442nd Air Expeditionary Squadron and converted to provisional status on 13 May 2011
Activated 17 January 2017
Inactivated 10 June 2021

Assignments
 320th Bombardment Group, 1 July 1942 – 4 December 1945
 320th Bombardment Group, 9 July 1947 – 27 June 1949
 320th Bombardment Wing, 1 December 1952 – 15 September 1960
 Air Combat Command to activate or inactivate as needed after 13 May 2011
386th Air Expeditionary Wing, 17 January 2017 – 10 June 2021

Stations

 MacDill Field, Florida, 1 July 1942
 Drane Field, Florida, 8–28 August 1942
 RAF Hethel (AAF-114), England, 12 September 1942
 RAF Tibenham (AAF-124), England, 1 October 1942
 Oran Es Sénia Airport, Algeria, 9 January 1943
 Tafaraoui Airfield, Algeria, 28 January 1943
 Montesquieu Airfield, Algeria, 14 April 1943
 Massicault Airfield, Tunisia, 29 June 1943
 El Bathan Airfield, Tunisia, 28 July 1943
 Decimomannu Airfield, Sardinia, Italy, 9 November 1943

 Alto Airfield, Corsica, France, 20 September 1944
 Dijon-Longvic Airfield (Y-9), France, 11 November 1944
 Dôle-Tavaux Airfield (Y-7), France, 2 April 1945
 AAF Station Herzogenaurach (R-29), Germany, 22 June 1945
 Clastres Airfield, France (A-71), c. October-27 November 1945
 Camp Shanks, New York, 4–6 December 1945
 Mitchel Field, New York, 9 July 1947 – 27 June 1949
 March Air Force Base, California, 1 December 1952 – 15 September 1960
 Erbil Air Base, Iraq, 17 January 2017 – 10 June 2021

Aircraft
 Martin B-26 Marauder, 1942–1945
 Boeing B-29 Superfortress, 1952–1953
 Boeing YRB-47B Stratojet, 1953
 Boeing B-47 Stratojet, 1953–1960

References

 Notes

 Citations

Bibliography

 
 
 
 
 
 

Air expeditionary squadrons of the United States Air Force